This is a list of the National Register of Historic Places listings in Bryce Canyon National Park.

This is intended to be a complete list of the properties and districts on the National Register of Historic Places in Bryce Canyon National Park, Utah, United States.  The locations of National Register properties and districts for which the latitude and longitude coordinates are included below, may be seen in a Google map.

There are 13 properties and districts listed on the National Register in the park, one of which is a National Historic Landmark.

Current listings 

|--

|}

See also 

 National Register of Historic Places listings in Garfield County, Utah
 List of National Historic Landmarks in Utah

References 
Caywood, Janene. National Register of Historic Places Multiple Property Documentation Form: Bryce Canyon National Park Multiple Property Submission. National Park Service December 31, 1994 

Bryce Canyon National Park